The 2003 Peterborough municipal election took place on November 10, 2003, to elect a mayor, councillors, and school trustees in the city of Peterborough, Ontario.

Sylvia Sutherland was narrowly re-elected in the mayoral contest.

Results

Mayor

Margeree Edwards was raised in the Welland area and attended Cornell University in New York, where she received a Master's Degree in communications and a Ph.D. in education (curriculum and instruction). She also holds a Bachelor of Science degree in nutritional science from the University of Guelph (1964). She taught at Brock University's College of Education before moving to Peterborough in 1979. She moved to Toronto in 1981 to work at the old City of York's health unit; after leaving this employment, she returned to Peterborough in 1989. In 1994, she started a communications company. She has also co-ordinated the Ontario Drug Awareness Partnership, and in 2000 she authored a book entitled First I bought a Paddle: A Beginner's Guide to Canoeing in the Kawarthas. Edwards served on the Peterborough Utilities Commission from 1991 until her first election to city council in 1997. Following this election, she chaired the community funding committee and the transportation committee. She was re-elected in 2000, promising to improve transportation and health care and to revitalize Peterborough with programs celebrating its diversity. She returned to the utilities commission in 2001 as a council representative. In the same year, she worked to establish an effective anti-loitering bylaw. She also supported a grant to Showplace Peterborough, although she unsuccessfully tried to have the grant reduced from forty-five thousand to twenty-five thousand dollars. She opposed a controversial parkway extension through municipal green space. In 2003, she supported a symbolic motion asking Canada to stay out of the American invasion of Iraq. Sixty-two years old in the 2003 mayoral election, she refused to accept donations from Peterborough developers or Ontario numbered companies. During the campaign, she was diagnosed with colon cancer and took time off for surgery and recuperation. This delayed her campaign launch, but she did not withdraw from the contest; her campaign highlighted environmental issues, youth employment, and affordable housing. There was some discussion that Edwards could become the New Democratic Party candidate for Peterborough in the 2004 federal election, but nothing came of this. She later became chair of the group Peterborough Green-Up. In 2008, she was appointed to the council of the College of Midwives of Ontario.

Council

Allan Deck ran for the Peterborough City Council in the elections of 1997, 2000 and 2003. He finished third in his first campaign and received 1,768 votes (21.02%) for another third-place finish in 2000. A businessman, he was sixty-four years old in 2003 and called for more parkland, lower taxes, and more activities for seniors. He also supported hiring more police officers.

Peterborough County
Smith-Ennismore-Lakefield

References
 JoElle Kovach, "City releases final municipal election stats," Peterborough Examiner, 13 November 2003, B3; "Municipal Election 2003: Results from the townships," Peterborough This Week, 12 November 2003, 07.

2003 Ontario municipal elections
Politics of Peterborough, Ontario